The state anthem of the Republic of Buryatia is one of the state symbols of Buryatia, together with the flag and coat of arms of the Russian federal subject. It was first used unofficially for the Buryat Autonomous Soviet Socialist Republic, between 1983 and 1990 titled "Song of the Native Land" with original lyrics in Russian.

The anthem was written by Buryat poet Damba Zhalsarayev, while the music was composed by Buryat composer and music teacher Anatoliy Andreyev. It was adopted on 20 April 1995 with Law N121-I "On the State Anthem of the Republic of Buryatia".

Lyrics
Lyrics are official in both Buryat and Russian languages. An unofficial singable English translation is also shown.

Buryat version

Russian version

English translation

See also
 Flag of Buryatia
 Coat of arms of Buryatia
 State Anthem of the Republic of Kalmykia
 National anthem of Mongolia
 List of national anthems

Notes

References

External links
 , via the YouTube channel of the Ministry of Culture of Buryatia.
 Music, Russian vocal version

Regional songs
Buryatia
Asian anthems
Buryatia
National anthem compositions in D minor